The men's tournament of the 2010 European Curling Championships took place from December 4 – 11, 2010. The winners of the Group C tournament in Howwood, Scotland (Slovakia and Belarus) move on to the Group B tournament in Monthey.
The top eight men's teams at the 2010 ECC represented their nations at the 2011 Ford World Men's Curling Championship in Regina, Saskatchewan, Canada.

A change in the system of play sees the C group games played as a qualifier and was held from September 24–28, 2010.  Ranking from the 2009 European Curling Championships determined the group placings for the 2010 tournament.

Group A

Teams

Standings

Results

Draw 1
Saturday, December 4, 12:00

Draw 2
Saturday, December 4, 20:00

Draw 3
Sunday, December 5, 16:00

Draw 4
Monday, December 6, 8:00

Draw 5
Monday, December 6th, 16:00

Draw 6
Tuesday, December 7, 10:00

Draw 7
Tuesday, December 7, 19:00

Draw 8
Wednesday, December 8, 16:00

Draw 9
Thursday, December 9th, 8:00

Tie-breaker 7/8 game
Thursday, December 9, 20:00

World Challenge

Challenge 1
Friday, December 10, 20:00

Challenge 2
Saturday, December 11, 09:30

Challenge 3
Saturday, December 11, 13:00

 moves on to the 2011 World Men's Championships.

Playoffs

Page 1 vs. 2
Thursday, December 9, 20:00

Page 3 vs. 4
Thursday, December 9, 20:00

Semifinal
Friday, December 10, 16:00

Bronze-medal game
Saturday, December 11, 8:00

Gold-medal game
Saturday, December 11, 16:00

Group B

Teams
Group B1

Group B2

Standings

Results
Note:  did not start any of their matches, resulting in an automatic walkover for each match.

Draw 1
Saturday, December 4, 8:00

Draw 2
Saturday, December 4, 16:00

Draw 3
Sunday, December 5, 8:00

Draw 4
Sunday, December 5, 16:00

Draw 5
Monday, December 6, 8:00

Draw 6
Monday, December 6, 16:00

Draw 7
Tuesday, December 7, 8:00

Draw 8
Tuesday, December 7, 16:00

Draw 9
Wednesday, December 8, 8:00

Draw 10
Wednesday, December 8, 16:00

Playoffs

Page 1 vs. 1
Thursday, December 9, 18:30

Page 2 vs. 2
Thursday, December 9, 18:30

Semifinal
Friday, December 10, 8:00

Bronze-medal game
Saturday, December 11, 9:30

Gold-medal game
Friday, December 10, 13:00

Group C

Teams

Standings

Results

Round 1
Friday, 24 September, 21:00

 receives bye this round.

Round 2
Saturday, 25 September, 12:00

 receives bye this round.

Round 3
Saturday, 25 September, 19:00

 receives bye this round.

Round 4
Sunday, 26 September, 10:00

 receives bye this round.

Round 5
Sunday, 26 September, 15:00

 receives bye this round.

Round 6
Monday, 27 September, 18:00

 receives bye this round.

Round 7
Monday, 27 September, 18:00

 receives bye this round.

Final
Tuesday, 28 September, 18:00

 and  advance to the Group B competition in Monthey.

References

External links
European Curling Championships 2010 - Men's Results Page
2010 ECC Group C
Group A Draw Schedule
Group B Draw Schedule

European Curling Championships
European Curling Championships - Mens Tournament, 2010